Robert Bruce Avakian (born March 7, 1943) is an American political activist who is the founder and chairman of the Revolutionary Communist Party, USA (RCP). Coming out of the New Left of the 1960s and influenced strongly by Maoism, Avakian developed the RCP's theoretical framework, "the New Synthesis" or "New Communism". He has written several books over four decades, including an autobiography.

Early life
Avakian was born on March 7, 1943, in Washington, D.C., to Ruth and Spurgeon Avakian (an Armenian American lawyer, civil rights activist, and later judge on the Alameda County, California superior court), and, after spending his first three years in the Washington metropolitan area, spent the rest of his childhood and adolescence in Berkeley, California. In Berkeley, Avakian developed close friendships with several African-American schoolmates, which he cites as influencing his development of an anti-racist, egalitarian politics.

Political activities

As a young man, Avakian became involved with the Students for a Democratic Society (SDS) at Berkeley, the Free Speech Movement and the Black Panther Party. In 1968, he wrote articles for the Peace and Freedom Party's publications and in July 1969, he spoke at the Black Panther conference in Oakland, California. By the time that the SDS split into three factions in the summer of 1969, Avakian was a leading member of the Revolutionary Youth Movement II faction, and was their candidate for National Secretary. Although defeated for the top position by Mark Rudd of the faction soon known as the Weather Underground, Avakian was elected to the National Interim Committee. During that period, Avakian was a leading member of the Bay Area Revolutionary Union alongside Leibel Bergman.

In the early 1970s, Avakian served a prison sentence for desecrating the American flag during a demonstration. He was charged with assaulting a police officer in January 1979 at a demonstration in Washington, D.C. to protest Deng Xiaoping's meeting with Jimmy Carter. After receiving an arrest warrant, Avakian "jumped bail" and fled to France.  In 1980, he gave a speech to 200 protestors in downtown Oakland and his police assault charges were dropped a few years later.

In 2005, Avakian published an autobiography, From Ike to Mao and Beyond: My Journey from Mainstream America to Revolutionary Communist. He has been the Revolutionary Communist Party's central committee chairman and national leader since 1979. In 2016, the RCP USA and others helped form the organization Refuse Fascism, which called for the removal of Donald Trump.

In August 2020, Avakian released a statement about the rise of fascism in America, calling on supporters to use "every appropriate means of non-violent action" to remove Trump, including voting for Joe Biden for President of the United States, while continuing to organize for revolution.

Legacy
Avakian is a controversial figure, who the RCP acknowledges is both "loved and hated." He is viewed by supporters as a revolutionary leader whose body of work has advanced communist theory and represents a "pathway to human emancipation" from the capitalist system. He is criticized by detractors for an alleged cult of personality around him, which the party has called "lies and slander."

Bibliography
Books
 The Loss in China and the Revolutionary Legacy of Mao Tse-tung (1979)
 Mao Tse-tung’s Immortal Contributions (1979)
Conquer The World? The International Proletariat Must and Will (1981)
For a Harvest of Dragons (1983)
 A Horrible End, or an End to the Horror? (1984)
 Bullets: From the Writings, Speeches, and Interviews of Bob Avakian (1985)
 Democracy: Can't We Do Better Than That? (1986)
 Phony Communism is Dead—Long Live Real Communism (1992)
 Preaching from a Pulpit of Bones: We Need Morality But Not Traditional Morality (1999)
 Observations on Art and Culture, Science and Philosophy (2005)
 From Ike to Mao and Beyond: My Journey from Mainstream America to Revolutionary Communist: A Memoir (2005)
 Away with All Gods! Unchaining the Mind and Radically Changing the World (2008)
 Communism and Jeffersonian Democracy (2008)
Birds Cannot Give Birth to Crocodiles, But Humanity Can Soar Beyond the Horizon (2010)
 BAsics, from the Talks and Writings of Bob Avakian (2011)
 What Humanity Needs: Revolution and the New Synthesis of Communism (2012)
 Constitution, Law, and Rights in Capitalist Society and in the Future Socialist Society (2015)
 The New Communism: The Science, the Strategy, the Leadership for an Actual Revolution, and a Radically New Society on the Road to Real Emancipation (2016)
 Breakthroughs: The Historic Breakthrough by Marx, and the Further Breakthrough with the New Communism (2019)
Hope For Humanity On A Scientific Basis: Breaking with Individualism, Parasitism and American Chauvinism (2019)

Films
 Revolution: Why It's Necessary, Why It's Possible, What It's All About (2003)
 Revolution—Nothing Less! (2012)
 Revolution and Religion: The Fight for Emancipation and the Role of Religion; A Dialogue Between Cornel West & Bob Avakian (2015)
 The Trump/Pence Regime Must Go! In the Name of Humanity, We REFUSE To Accept a Fascist America, A Better World IS Possible (2017)
 Why We Need An Actual Revolution And How We Can Really Make Revolution (2018)
Articles and Essays

 The Truth About Right-Wing Conspiracy…And Why Clinton and the Democrats Are No Answer (1998)
The Movement Is Great...But The Movement Is Not "Everything"...The People Need Revolution (2001)
The Pyramid of Power And the Struggle to Turn This Whole Thing Upside Down (2004)
Valuing the Lives of the People vs. Wanton Police Murder: When the Proletariat Rules (2004)
Bob Avakian in a Discussion with Comrades on Epistemology- On Knowing and Changing the World (2004)
Bob Avakian: On Internationalism (2004)
The Revolutionary Potential of the Masses and the Responsibility of the Vanguard (2005)
Do the Masses Need Bill Cosby’s Scolding or Do They Need Leadership to Put an End to Oppression? (2005)
Changes in the World and the "Clash of Civilizations" — Within This Civilization (2005)
The Republi-Fascists... and the Republi-crats and Where Is the Real Alternative? (2005)
There Is No “They” ...But There is a Definite Direction to Things: The Dynamics Within The Ruling Class, and the Challenges for Revolutionaries (2005)
Not Being Jerry Rubin, Or Even Dimitrov, But Actually Being Revolutionary Communists: The Challenge of Defending Fundamental Rights -- From A Communist Perspective, and No Other  (2005)
The Fascists and the Destruction of the “Weimar Republic”...And What Will Replace It (2005) 
"A Leap of Faith" and a Leap to Rational Knowledge: Two Very Different Kinds of Leaps, Two Radically Different Worldviews and Methods (2005)
 Three Alternative Worlds (2005)
Statement by Bob Avakian, Chairman of the Revolutionary Communist Party, on the Occasion of the Death of Willie "Mobile" Shaw (2005)
Polarization...Repolarization...and Revolution (2006)
Reform or Revolution: Questions of Orientation, Questions of Morality (2006)
The Need for Communists to be…Communists (2006) 
The Revolution We Are About Should Not Only Encompass But Welcome the Arundhati Roys of the World (2006)
The Struggle in the Realm of Ideas (2006)
The Role of Dissent in a Vibrant Society (2006)
Resistance, Revolution, and What Should — and Should Not — Be Supported (2007)
Why Is Religious Fundamentalism Growing in Today’s World—And What Is the Real Alternative? (2007)
On Racism and The System: Thoughts on reading Clarence Page’s “Hung Up on Noose News” (2007)
Refusal to Resist Crimes Against Humanity Is Itself a Crime (2007)
Naomi Klein’s The Shock Doctrine and its Anti-Communist Distortions—Unfortunately, No Shock There (2008)
The Objective Situation, The Bush Regime, and the Bourgeois Elections (2008) 
On Obama, Redemption and the Need for a Scientific Understanding (2008)
Obama: Playing the Trump Card? (2008)
On the Role of Communist Leadership and Some Basic Questions of Orientation, Approach and Method (2009)
On the inauguration, crimes...and complicity (2009) 
Revolution and a Radically New World: Contending "Universalisms" and Communist Internationalism (2009) 
On the Relation of Individuals, Classes and the Abolition of Classes (2009)
Revolutionary Strategy, Bringing Forward a Revolutionary People (2009)
"Crises in Physics," Crises in Philosophy and Politics (2009)
There Is No "Permanent Necessity" For Things To Be This Way: A Radically Different and Better World Can Be Brought Into Being Through Revolution (2010)
 Some Observations on the Culture Wars: Textbooks, Movies, Sham Shakespearean Tragedies and Crude Lies (2010)
 A Reflection On The ‘Occupy’ Movement: An Inspiring Beginning…And The Need To Go Further (2011)
 A Question Sharply Posed: Nat Turner or Thomas Jefferson? (2013)
 On "Principled Compromises", and Other Crimes Against Humanity  (2015)
 Fascists and Communists: Completely Opposed and Worlds Apart (2019)
 Bob Avakian Responds To Mark Rudd On The Lessons Of The 1960s And The Need For An Actual Revolution—Infantile Expressions of Outrage, or Accommodation to This Monstrous System, Are Not the Only Alternatives (2020)
 The Deadly Illusion of "Normalcy" and the Revolutionary Way Forward (2020)
 This Republic—Ridiculous, Outmoded, Criminal (2020)
 Revolting Barbarity, Shameless Hypocrisy...For Those Who Cling to the Myth of “This Great American Democracy”: Some Simple Questions (2020)
 Dictatorship and Communism—Facts and Foolishness (2020)
 Radical Change Is Coming: Will It Be Emancipating, or Enslaving—Revolutionary, or Reactionary? (2020)
 On Civil War and Revolution (2020)
 Anything But The Truth: Bob Avakian Exposes Lies, Distortions, Distractions and Evasions About the Murderous Oppression of Black People (2020)
 On Statues, Monuments, and Celebrating—or Ending—Oppression (2020)
 Capitalism-Imperialism—The Suffocation of Seven Billion—and the Profound Need For a World on New Foundations (2020)
 Patriarchy and Male Supremacy, or Revolution and Ending All Oppression? (2020)
 Patriarchy and Patriotism—Aggressive Male Supremacy and American Supremacy—The Danger and the Immediate Challenge (2020)
 Statement By Bob Avakian: On the Immediate Critical Situation, The Urgent Need to Drive Out the Trump/Pence Regime, Voting in this Election, and the Fundamental Need For Revolution (2020)
 Biden, A Doorknob—and Going Through the Door (2020)
New Year's Statement by Bob Avakian: A New Year, The Urgent Need For A Radically New World—For The Emancipation Of All Humanity (2021)
Shakespeare and Strategic Commanders of the Revolution (2021)

In popular culture
James LeGros portrays Avakian in the 1995 Mario Van Peebles film Panther.

Notes

External links

1943 births
Activists from the San Francisco Bay Area
American activists
American atheists
American autobiographers
American people of Armenian descent
American political party founders
Living people
Members of the Revolutionary Communist Party, USA
Peace and Freedom Party politicians
Writers from the San Francisco Bay Area
Writers from Washington, D.C.